Ágnes Szatmári (born 28 June 1987) is a Romanian former professional tennis player.

On 24 March 2008, she reached her highest singles ranking of 187 by the Women's Tennis Association (WTA). On 20 August 2007, she reached her highest WTA doubles ranking of 123.

She won two singles and 14 doubles titles on the ITF Women's Circuit.

Szatmári was coached by Portik Endre.

ITF Circuit finals

Singles: 8 (2–6)

Doubles: 28 (14–14)

Year-end rankings

References

External links

 
 

1987 births
Living people
People from Gheorgheni
Romanian female tennis players
Romanian sportspeople of Hungarian descent